Pierre Lataillade (27 April 1933 – 7 November 2020) was a French politician.

Biography
Lataillade began his political career on the Municipal Council of Arcachon in 1956. He was very quickly spotted by Mayor Lucien de Gracia, who made him his deputy. He then continued his duties as a deputy for Robert Fleury. Fleury resigned as Mayor in 1985, leaving the position to Lataillade. Lataillade won the mayoral elections of 1985, 1989, and 1995. However, he was defeated by Yves Foulon in 2001. He subsequently retired from political life.

In addition to his mayoral duties, Lataillade served as a Member of the European Parliament, a Deputy for Gironde's 7th constituency, and a General Councillor for the Canton of Arcachon.

Pierre Lataillade died in Gujan-Mestras on 7 November 2020 at the age of 87.

References

1933 births
2020 deaths
20th-century French politicians
21st-century French politicians
MEPs for France 1984–1989
MEPs for France 1989–1994
MEPs for France 1994–1999
Members of the National Assembly (France)
Mayors of places in Nouvelle-Aquitaine
Rally for the Republic politicians